World Beach Wrestling Championships is the annual world championship organized by United World Wrestling for the sport of beach wrestling.

History
The first World Championships took place in 2006, alongside the resurrected FILA Sambo World Championships, in Antalya, Turkey. Only the Senior division was featured until 2010, and each age division has separate men and women divisions. There were initially only two weight classes for each of the gender divisions within the Senior division, lightweight and heavyweight. The number of weight classes expanded beginning in 2011, with the Senior men's division featuring four weight classes (70 kg, 80 kg, 90 kg, and heavyweight) and the Senior women's division featuring three weight classes (60 kg, 70 kg, and heavyweight).

Although not officially recognized by UWW as a World Championship, many nations recognize the beach wrestling competition of the World Wrestling Games to be the World Beach Wrestling Championship in 2007 (hosted in Antalya, Turkey) and 2008 (hosted in Durres, Albania). The same recognition is generally not given to the 2009 World Wrestling Games (hosted in Siauliai, Lithuania) as the Beach Wrestling World Championships made its officially sanctioned return. The World Wrestling Games also featured championships in Grappling and Sambo, with the three styles being collectively known as the "developing styles" at the time.

Beginning in 2019, the World Championships for the senior division will be determined via a point system during the Beach Wrestling World Series. The Beach Wrestling World Series features multiple international competitions, with each event awarding 15,000 CHF in prize money. The World Beach Wrestling Championships will remain as a singular event to determine the World Champion in the cadet and junior age divisions.

Competitions

Medallists (elite)

Men

70kg

80kg

85kg

90kg

+90kg 
 +85kg: 2006, 2009, 2010
 +90kg: 2011-2022

Women

50kg

60kg

70kg

+70kg

See also

Beach Wrestling

References

External links 
 
 
United World Wrestling Database
exotic beaches in the world
2015 Beach World Championships United World Wrestling
Beach Wrestling Rules

Amateur wrestling
Wrestling competitions
United World Wrestling
Beach sports competitions
Wrestling, Beach